Heartbeeps is a 1981 American romantic science fiction comedy film about two robots who fall in love and decide to strike out on their own. The film was directed by Allan Arkush, written by John Hill, and stars Andy Kaufman and Bernadette Peters as the robots. It was Kaufman's final performance in a theatrical film. Universal Pictures released the film in the United States on December 18, 1981.
 
Stan Winston's make-up work for Heartbeeps made him one of the nominees for the inaugural Academy Award for Best Makeup in 1982, losing to Rick Baker for An American Werewolf in London.

Plot 
Val Com 17485 (Andy Kaufman), a robot designed to be a valet with a specialty in lumber commodities, meets Aqua Com 89045 (Bernadette Peters), a hostess companion robot whose primary function is to assist at poolside parties. At a factory awaiting repairs, they fall in love and decide to escape, stealing a van from the company to do so.

They embark on a quest to find a place to live, as well as satisfy their more immediate need for a fresh electrical supply. They assemble a small robot, Phil, built out of spare parts, whom they treat as their child, and are joined by Catskill, a mechanical standup comic (which is seen sitting the entire film).

A malfunctioning law-enforcement robot, the Crimebuster, overhears the orders of the repair workers to get the robots back and goes after the fugitives. With the help of humans who run a junkyard, and using Catskill's battery pack, the robots are able to save Phil before running out of power and being returned to the factory. Brought back to the factory the robots are repeatedly repaired and their memories cleared. Because they continue to malfunction they are junked. They are found by the humans who run the junk yard and reassembled. In the junkyard they live happily and build a robot daughter. The film ends with Crimebuster, after only pretending to have his mind erased, continuing to malfunction, going on another mission to recover the fugitive robots.

Cast

Production

Development
Sigourney Weaver was offered a role and was interested in the film, as she wanted to work with Andy Kaufman, but Weaver's agent persuaded her to turn it down. 

Because of a strike by the Screen Actors Guild, filming was shut down in July 1980 (along with numerous other movies and television shows). The strike ended at the beginning of October 1980 (filming had started in June).

In his 1999 book Andy Kaufman: Revealed, Bob Zmuda wrote that Kaufman and Zmuda had "pitched" the screenplay of Kaufman's The Tony Clifton Story, a movie about the life and times of his alter-ego Tony Clifton, to Universal Studios. The Universal executives were concerned that Kaufman had not acted in films, except for a small role, and arranged for him to star in Heartbeeps to test whether he could carry a movie. When it became "a box office disaster", plans for the Clifton movie were cancelled.

John Hill adapted the screenplay into a novel, Heartbeeps, published in December 1981.

The film was promoted in magazines such as Starlog and Famous Monsters.

Reception

Critical response
Reviews of the film were negative. On Rotten Tomatoes the film has a score of 0% based on reviews from 6 critics, with an average rating of 1.6/10.

Vincent Canby wrote in The New York Times that it was "unbearable" and a "dreadfully coy story." Gary Arnold from the Washington Post noted how the film's stars Kaufman and Peters were "unlikely to face serious career setbacks from a minor fiasco only a handful of people will ever see," adding that he faulted the film for having "so little inherent momentum that it seems to need rewinding every few minutes."

Gene Siskel and Roger Ebert both gave the film a thumbs down, unfavorably comparing it to Star Wars, The Wizard of Oz and the 1967 Jean-Luc Godard film Weekend.

Kaufman felt the movie was so bad that he personally apologized for it on Late Night with David Letterman, and, as a joke, promised to refund the money of everyone who paid to see it. Letterman's response was that if Kaufman wanted to issue such a refund, he'd "better have change for a 20 (dollar bill)."

Accolades 

 Note: the film was nominated for Worst Picture both back when the original 1981 ballot was made and when it was revised in 2007. It lost both times.

Home media
The film was released on DVD on September 13, 2005 and on Blu-ray on February 4, 2020.

References

External links
 
 
 
 
 
 Heartbeeps on TheMakeupGallery

1981 films
1981 comedy films
1981 romantic comedy films
1980s American films
1980s English-language films
1980s science fiction comedy films
American robot films
American romantic comedy films
American science fiction romance films
American science fiction comedy films
Films directed by Allan Arkush
Films produced by Michael Phillips (producer)
Films scored by John Williams
Puppet films
Universal Pictures films